The South Carolina Gamecocks women's tennis team represents the University of South Carolina and competes in the Southeastern Conference.  The team has been coached by Kevin Epley since 2012.

Head coaches

Year-by-Year Results

References